Alfred Parker may refer to:
 Alfred Browning Parker, Modernist architect 
 Alfred Parker (mayor), New South Wales politician

See also
 Al Parker (disambiguation)